The 1967 Hofstra Flying Dutchmen football team was an American football team that represented Hofstra University during the 1967 NCAA College Division football season. Hofstra finished second in the Middle Atlantic Conference, University Division.

In their 18th year under head coach Howard "Howdy" Myers Jr., the Flying Dutchmen compiled an 8–2 record, and outscored opponents 241 to 78. Mike D'Amato, Frank Marcinowski and Ed Wozniak were the team captains. 

Hofstra's 3–1 conference record was the second-best in the MAC University Division. Its only conference loss was to that year's champion, Temple (4–0).

The Flying Dutchmen played their home games at Hofstra Stadium on the university's Hempstead campus on Long Island, New York.

Schedule

References

Hofstra
Hofstra Pride football seasons
Hofstra Flying Dutchmen football